Panchagangavalli River is a river flowing through Kundapur and Gangolli in western India. The five rivers namely Souparnika River, Varahi River, Kedaka River, Chakra River and Kubja River join and merge into Arabian sea.

References 

Rivers of Karnataka
Rivers of India